In geometry, a radiodrome is the pursuit curve followed by a point that is pursuing another linearly-moving point. The classic (and best-known) form of a radiodrome is known as the "dog curve"; this is the path a dog follows when it swims across a stream with a current after something it has spotted on the other side. Because the dog drifts with the current, it will have to change its heading; it will also have to swim further than if it had taken the optimal heading. This case was described by Pierre Bouguer in 1732.

A radiodrome may alternatively be described as the path a dog follows when chasing a hare, assuming that the hare runs in a straight line at a constant velocity.

Mathematical analysis
Introduce a coordinate system with origin at the position of the dog at time
zero and with y-axis in the direction the hare is running with the constant
speed  .
    
The dog runs with the constant speed   towards the instantaneous position of the hare.

The differential equation corresponding to the movement of the dog, is consequently
    
    

It is possible to obtain a closed-form analytic expression  for the motion of the dog.
    

    
one gets
    
or
    

From this relation, it follows that
    
where   is the constant of integration  determined by the initial value of '  at time zero, i.e.,
    

    

    

If, now, relation  integrates to
    
where  is the constant of integration. Since again , it's
    

    

If  , relation gives, instead,
    
Using  once again, it follows that

   

If  , it follows from  that 
    

See also
Mice problem

References
.

Plane curves
Differential equations
Analytic geometry
Pursuit–evasion